Valdaysky (masculine), Valdayskaya (feminine), or Valdayskoye (neuter) may refer to:

Valdaysky District, a district of Novgorod Oblast, Russia
Valdayskoye Urban Settlement, a municipal formation which the town of district significance of Valday in Valdaysky District of Novgorod Oblast, Russia is incorporated as
Valdayskoye (rural locality), a rural locality (a settlement) in Kaliningrad Oblast, Russia

See also
Valday (disambiguation)